James Donald Abson (September 30, 1920 – November 21, 2008) was a Canadian football defensive back and flying wing. He played for the Ottawa Rough Riders from 1945 to 1946.

References 

1920 births
2008 deaths
Canadian football defensive backs
Ottawa Rough Riders players
Players of Canadian football from Ontario
Canadian football people from Ottawa